Samuel Rotondi (born April 22, 1946, in Stoneham, Massachusetts) is an American attorney and politician who represented the Fourth Middlesex District in the Massachusetts Senate from 1977 to 1983. He was an unsuccessful candidate for Lieutenant Governor of Massachusetts in 1982 and the United States House of Representatives (7th congressional district) in 1984.

References

1946 births
Democratic Party Massachusetts state senators
People from Winchester, Massachusetts
Brown University alumni
Suffolk University Law School alumni
Living people
Massachusetts lawyers